Brendan Williams may refer to:

 Brendan Williams (politician) (born 1968), American politician in Washington State
 Brendan Williams (rugby union) (born 1978), Australian rugby union footballer